Pritchardia thurstonii is a species of flowering plant in the family Arecaceae.
It is endemic to Fiji, in particular the Lau Islands.
It is threatened by habitat loss.

It is sometimes known as the Thurston's palm or the Lau fan palm and is named after a former Fijian Governor John Bates Thurston.

References

 Palms and Cycad Society of Australia 
 Desert Tropicals 

thurstonii
Trees of Fiji
Near threatened plants
Endemic flora of Fiji
Taxonomy articles created by Polbot
Taxa named by Carl Georg Oscar Drude
Taxa named by Ferdinand von Mueller